Birthday Girl is a 2001 erotic comedy thriller film directed by Jez Butterworth. The plot focuses on English bank clerk John Buckingham, who orders a Russian mail-order bride, Nadia. It becomes clear upon her arrival that Nadia cannot speak English, and early into her stay, two mysterious men come to the house claiming to be her cousin and cousin's friend. The film features Nicole Kidman, Ben Chaplin, Mathieu Kassovitz, and Vincent Cassel. English and Russian are spoken interchangeably in the film.

Plot 
John Buckingham (Ben Chaplin), an introverted, lonely St Albans bank clerk, orders a mail-order bride Nadia (Nicole Kidman) from Russia on the Internet. John is uncomfortable and shy, but Nadia is sexually bold.

Although Nadia cannot speak English and John cannot speak Russian, they soon bond. Later on, a man she introduces as her cousin Yuri (Mathieu Kassovitz) and his friend Alexei (Vincent Cassel) turn up to celebrate her birthday. Alexei soon shows that he has a temper.

After a violent altercation, Alexei holds Nadia hostage and demands a ransom from John. As he has grown to care for Nadia, he is forced to steal from the bank where he has worked for ten years. After the ransom is paid, he realises that he has been the victim of an elaborate con.  Nadia, Yuri, and Alexei are criminals, and Alexei is actually Nadia's boyfriend.

The trio have carried out the same scam on men from Switzerland, Greece and Germany. They take John prisoner, strip him down to his underpants, and tie him to a toilet in a motel. He eventually frees himself and quickly learns that Nadia has been left behind after Alexei discovered she was pregnant. John gets dressed and subsequently fights with her, who later reveals that she can indeed speak English and that her name is not Nadia.

John takes Nadia to turn her in to the police, hoping to clear his name as a wanted bank robber. Ultimately however, he sympathises with her and decides against it. He leaves her at the airport, where she is kidnapped by Alexei, who now wants Nadia to have the baby. John rescues her, tying Alexei to a chair. They work together against the two Russian men. Nadia tells John that her real name is Sophia. John, disguised as Alexei, leaves for Russia with her.

Cast 
 Nicole Kidman as Sophia/Nadia
 Ben Chaplin as John Buckingham
 Vincent Cassel as Alexei
 Mathieu Kassovitz as Yuri
 Kate Evans as Clare
 Stephen Mangan as Bank Manager
 Xander Armstrong as Robert Moseley
 Sally Phillips as Karen
 Jo McInnes as Waitress
 Ben Miller as Concierge
 Jonathan Aris as D.I. O'Fetiger
 Steve Pemberton as Duty Sergeant
 Reece Shearsmith as Porter
 Mark Gatiss as Porter

Reception 
The film  grossed $16,171,098.

It has a 58% approval on Rotten Tomatoes with an average rating of 5.71/10, indicating a mixed critical reception. Jason Solomon of The Observer praised the casting  "Cassel, Kassovitz and Kidman are beautifully graceful against the backdrop of signs to Tring and Newbury." He continued  "The comedy here is gentle, formed of linguistic misunderstandings and cultural clashes and Chaplin's constant efforts to be polite are rather charming. Kidman's exoticism, encapsulated by her peasant-chic wardrobe, is fresh air in St Albans." The BBC reviewer gave the film 4 out of 5 stars, praised Chaplin's and Kidman's "infectious performances" and describe it as a "sparky" and "deviant topical comedy which is funny from start to finish." CNN praised Kidman's "astounding range" and applauded the dialogue as "often sharp, scathingly witty, and displays a wry intelligence."

The New York Times described the film as "competent" but decried the plot as too "insubstantial".

References

External links 
 
 Review of Birthday Girl at Cosmopolis

2001 films
2001 crime thriller films
2001 romantic comedy films
2000s crime comedy films
2000s erotic thriller films
American comedy thriller films
American crime comedy films
American crime thriller films
American erotic thriller films
American romantic comedy films
British comedy thriller films
British crime comedy films
British crime thriller films
British erotic thriller films
British romantic comedy films
2000s English-language films
Film4 Productions films
Films about con artists
Films directed by Jez Butterworth
Films scored by Stephen Warbeck
Films shot at Pinewood Studios
Films with screenplays by Jez Butterworth
2000s Russian-language films
2000s American films
2000s British films